George Frederick "Buzz" Beurling,  (6 December 1921 – 20 May 1948) was the most successful Canadian fighter pilot and flying ace of the Second World War.

Beurling was recognised as "Canada's most famous hero of the Second World War", as "The Falcon of Malta" and the "Knight of Malta", having been credited with shooting down 27 Axis aircraft in just 14 days over the besieged Mediterranean island. Before the war ended his official total climbed to either 31 or 31.

Beurling's wartime service was terminated prior to war's end, for repeated stunting and his lack of teamwork. Having found a way to potentially continue combat flying in the postwar era, Beurling was killed in a crash while attempting to deliver an aircraft to Israel.<ref>"George Frederick "Screwball" Beurling."  acesofww2.com'. Retrieved: 3 August 2009.</ref>

Early life
George Beurling was born in 1921 in Verdun (now part of Montreal), Quebec into a religious family and was the third of five children in the family. His father, Frederick Gustav Beurling, was Swedish and a commercial artist working for the Claude Neon Company. His mother, Hetty Florence Gibbs, is of English descent and was born in the Montreal suburb of Pointe-Saint-Charles.

George Beurling began to develop an interest in flying at the age of 6 when his father built him a model aircraft. His parents wanted him to study in McGill University and become a successful commercial artist like his father. At the age of 15, George quit school and took up a job to increase his income. One year later, he had logged 150 flying hours and passed all examinations for a commercial pilot licence.

Wanting to increase his flying experience, he went to China, hoping to join the Chinese Nationalist Air Force by crossing the US border. He was intending to head to San Francisco and work for some while in China and later sign up for the job. Eventually, he was arrested as an immigrant at the border and was repatriated back home. He first took the controls of an aircraft in 1933, and was flying solo by 1938. He left school to work for an air freight company in Gravenhurst, Ontario, and soon gained a commercial licence. Beurling joined the Royal Air Force (RAF) in September 1940.

Second World War
With the outbreak of war, Beurling tried to join the Royal Canadian Air Force (RCAF), but his lack of academic qualifications led to his rejection. He then tried to join the Finnish Air Force (which was fighting the Soviets in the Winter War), but could not get his parents' permission. Instead, Beurling sailed across the Atlantic on a convoy, landing in Glasgow, intending to enlist in the Royal Air Force. Unfortunately, he had forgotten his birth certificate and had to return to Canada. In September 1940, after he had survived the return trip, the RAF accepted him as a pilot.

Joining the RAF
Having survived one or two aerial misdemeanours, Beurling reached No. 7 Operational Training Unit, at RAF Hawarden, in September 1941. Beurling demonstrated considerable skill in training. In Hawarden, he came under the influence of the great Ginger Lacey, whose score at the time stood at 27. Lacey later commented about Beurling: "There are not two ways about it, he was a wonderful pilot and an even better shot."

These two factors, coupled with exceptional eyesight, were the keys to Beurling's later success. But they did not come without effort. At Hawarden, he immersed himself in gunnery, estimation of range, deflection, bullet trail and bullet drop, until his application of these became automatic. For him, flying and shooting became one single action.

In the middle of December, he was posted as a Sergeant Pilot to 403 Squadron, a RCAF "Article XV squadron", which had just moved to North Weald, Essex. He flew his first (uneventful) combat mission, in a Supermarine Spitfire, on Christmas Day 1941. Beurling remained with 403 for nearly four months, escorting bombers and flying fighter sweeps across the English Channel. Beurling did not get off an effective shot during his time with 403, despite being in  formations "jumped" by German fighters.

In early 1942, a change of policy by the RCAF required its squadrons to be staffed by RCAF personnel. Because Beurling had remained technically a member of the RAF, he was posted to 41 Squadron RAF in Sussex.

Two days later, as usual for a newcomer, he was assigned again to the number four position. He spotted a lone Fw 190, and broke from the flight to pursue it. He claimed the German fighter as probably destroyed 2 to 3 miles off Cap Gris Nez at approximately 12.00 hours. On this occasion, Beurling was reprimanded for attacking a target without permission, and became unpopular with his superiors and fellow pilots. As Red 4, finding himself alone in the sky, he made his way back across the Channel, joining up with Sgt Appleton mid-way. Counting all claims together, after Group revision, 3-1-2 Fw 190s were credited to the RAF FC pilots.

When another pilot was posted overseas, Beurling offered to take his place. Ordered to board a ship, he did not know his destination until the vessel reached Gibraltar. He was destined for No. 249 Squadron RAF, at Malta.

Malta (1942)

Fighter pilots played a critical role in the defence of Malta during its siege. Beurling landed on the island on 9 June, after having flown off the deck of  aboard his Spitfire, during Operation Salient. His nickname on Malta was "Screwball", an expletive he had a habit of using.

Beurling had his baptism of fire in the mid-morning of 12 June when, flying a Spitfire, with three other pilots from 249, the formation intercepted eight Bf 109s. Beurling claimed to have blown the tail off a Bf 109, but nobody saw it hit the ground, so he was credited with a "damaged". After that, Beurling claimed a series of kills that had no equal on the Mediterranean island. On 6 July 1942, with other pilots from 249, he attacked a formation of three Cant Z1007bis, 14 Reggiane Re.2001s and more than two dozen Macchi C.202s. He almost certainly shot down Sergente Francesco Pecchiari from 352a  Squadriglia. Then he claimed another Macchi that crashed near Zejtun, likely the Reggiane of Sottotenente Romano Pagliani, 152a Squadriglia. During this fight, the Italians claimed two Spitfires, one by Furio Niclot Doglio (that Beurling would kill three weeks later). RAF suffered no losses, but Beurling's aircraft was badly shot up. However he made a third claim that day, a Messerschmitt, hit from a distance of 800 yards.

On 10 July, Beurling's Malta tally rose to five in just four days, making him an ace. That day, it seems likely that he shot down the C.202 of Sergente Maggiore Francesco Visentini, from 378a Squadriglia.

On 12 July, Beurling, piloting a Spitfire and searching for Pilot Officer Berkeley-Hill, who was missing, spotted, at a lower altitude, Tenente Colonnello Aldo Quarantotti and Tenente Carlo Seganti, flying over Reggiane Re.2001, who in turn were looking for Lieutenant Francesco Vichi, who had disappeared while a Spitfire was chasing him.
Beurling, with Flying Officer Erik Hetherington, dived on the tail of the second of the two Reggianes and downed Seganti. Then Beurling attacked the other Reggiane. He closed up to 100 ft and just when Quarantotti spotted him, Beurling delivered a short burst that decapitated the Italian commander. This aircraft also fell into the sea. Two days later it was the Reggianes who attacked him and badly shot up his Spitfire. Beurling's aircraft was "riddled by better than 20 bullets through the fuselage and wings". "An explosive bullet nicked my right heel", he recalled.

On 22 July, Beurling lost his best friend in Malta, French-Canadian Pilot Jean Paradis. The following day, eight 249 Spitfires were scrambled. Beurling claimed to have badly damaged a bomber and, after a long dogfight with a Reggiane, to have blown "his left wing off". The 151a Squadriglia, in fact, lost Sergente Maggiore Bruno Di Pauli. The Macchi 202 pilot reported to have parachuted down after an AA shell had damaged his aircraft and realizing that he was followed by six Spitfires that, at the moment, had still not fired.

27 July was Beurling's "biggest day on Malta". That day, he shot down Sergente Faliero Gelli, and immediately afterwards, Captain Furio Niclot Doglio, Regia Aeronauticas best fighter, both flying Macchi MC. 202s.  Doglio, who was diving to counter attack the head-on Spitfires of 126 Squadron and had misunderstood the warning waggling of wings of his wingman, Maresciallo Ennio Tarantola (who had seen the oncoming 249 Squadron fighters from left, high above), was Beurling's 14th "kill".

On the same day, Beurling also claimed two Messerschmitt Bf 109 fighters, one of which was piloted by the ace Leutnant Karl-Heinz Preu of JG 53 although other sources attribute this to flak. On 24 July 1942, Beurling was awarded the Distinguished Flying Medal, the citation read:

On 30 July, he was commissioned as a pilot officer, and on 4 September won a bar to his DFM, largely for his exploits on 27 July. The citation read:

The enervation of daily combat combined with the effects of the poor rations and dysentery were telling. Beurling was bedridden for much of August and September, gaining only 1½ victories in August. On 8 August, while he was shooting at a Bf 109, he was jumped by two more. He claimed that he hit one and that it went straight into the sea. This was apparently confirmed by his section leader. But his aircraft was then hit in the engine and he belly-landed in a stone-walled field. "I climbed out, he recalled, unhurt except for a superficial cut in one arm." Beurling was shot down either by Herbert Rollwage or Siegfried Freytag and Fw Pohl of I./Jagdgeschwader 77 (JG 77—77th Fighter Wing), who all claimed a Spitfire shot down.

Beurling hitched back to Ta' Qali Field. On 25 September, he had another successful day, claiming to have downed three German fighters, but on this occasion his victories seem to be "overclaimed". That day, flying with 11 other Spitfires, he met a dozen Bf 109s 30 miles northeast of Zonqor Point. He claimed to have "disintegrated" a first Messerschmitt, to have damaged a second and put in flames a third, that "enveloped in flames, dived vertically striking the sea", the pilot bailing out. Two of these victims were two German fighters that came back to base, even if badly damaged and the third could be the one piloted by Kurt Gorbing, who made a forced-landing and died shortly afterwards.

On 10 October, Beurling was testing his newly serviced Spitfire when he was vectored to intercept two Bf 109s, flying line abreast at 1,000 ft over Filfla. He reported to have hit the "starboard fellow" in the engine: "He pancaked right smack down on his belly and flipped over onto his back." The second BF 109 tried to fly away but he hit the fuel tank: "The ship blow up, complete with pilot." Those kills brought Beurling's Malta tally to 21, plus another shared with two others. But there is no record of a Messerschmitt crashing on the island on 10 October 1942, nor any German losses. On the morning of 13 October, three miles north of St Paul’s Bay, Beurling, attacked a formation of Ju 88s, escorted by 30 Bf 109s. He claimed to have at first hit a bomber, then an oncoming Bf 109 that burst into flames. Seconds later, he shot at a second Messerschmitt, without observing strikes, "but pilot bailed out". On 16 October he was awarded the Distinguished Flying Cross, the citation read:

Beurling was a committed Christian and non-smoker.  He dedicated himself totally to the art of aerial combat. Tending to be a loner on the ground and in the air, Beurling angered his commanders with his disdain for teamwork. His relentless concentration on aerial fighting led Beurling to develop a marked skill at deflection shooting and together with his "situational awareness", he was soon recognised as a deadly fighter pilot. Like many successful Spitfire pilots, Beurling developed the habit of only engaging enemy aircraft at 250 yards or less – a range at which many other pilots would be breaking away. Beurling owed his spectacular success to remarkably good eyesight and the ability to "toss his Spitfire" into violent combat manoeuvres. If jumped from behind, he would pull back on the stick of his Mk VC Spitfire so hard that the aircraft would enter a violent stall, flick over and spin. This was a hard, sudden and very dangerous act for the enemy fighter on his tail to follow. Beurling would also ram both ailerons and rudder into a sudden and violent turn, causing his Spitfire to flip over and drop like a stone. Only a very experienced (or crazy) pilot would pull such stunts more than once or twice. Beurling made them a matter of habit. He knew that the Spitfire could be nursed out of such self-induced trouble and get him home safely.

But Beurling was not invincible; he was shot down four times over Malta. On 14 October 1942 (his last flight over Malta), Beurling scrambled with six other pilots from his squadron to intercept a raid of Ju 88s escorted by 60 Bf 109s, Macchi 202s and Reggiane 2001s just south of Zonqor Point. He strafed a bomber that he claimed to have shot down, but was, in turn, hit by return fire from the Ju 88: "I picked up about 30 bullet holes." Then he claimed to have damaged a Messerschmitt and to have blown the left wing of another Bf 109 off at the root. Seconds later, another German fighter hit him from below. He was wounded in the heel, elbow and ribs, and his Spitfire was set on fire. He managed to bail out into the sea. During this action, no Messerschmitt was in fact destroyed. Only 2. Staffel (Black 1/7619) of I/JG53, flown by Obfw Josef Edere who was wounded, was damaged in the action, and Edere crash-landed at San Pietro, Sicily. Beurling was probably shot down by Obfw Riker of 4/JG53 or Ltn Karl von Lieres of 2/JG27 (who was credited with his 26th). Of the seven Ju 88s claimed to have been shot down by the RAF, only one did not return. After his rescue, Beurling was hospitalised.

Beurling was then sent back to Britain on 31 October 1942. On the way, the B-24 transport aircraft he was aboard crashed into the sea off Gibraltar. Beurling was one of only three survivors.

On 4 November he received the Distinguished Service Order, the citation read:

Over Malta, he had claimed over 27 kills, by far the highest total by an RAF pilot during the campaign.

War bond drive

After landing back in Britain, Beurling was then sent to Canada to join a Victory Loan Drive, selling war bonds, being the guest of honour at a parade in Verdun and meeting Prime Minister Mackenzie King. He was promoted to war substantive Flying Officer (on probation) on 30 January 1943. He did not enjoy the war bond campaign. Also, he often said things that embarrassed the RCAF, such as that he enjoyed killing people. The leg wound Beurling had received over Malta, combined with his poor general health, returned him to hospital for several weeks. He completed his promotional work in mid-1943 and also met his future wife, Diana Whittall in Vancouver.

Instructor
Returning to Britain, Beurling was posted as a gunnery instructor to 61 OTU. On 27 May 1943, he was posted to the Central Gunnery School at RAF Sutton Bridge. On 8 June, during a mock dogfight, Beurling was forced to bail out of Spitfire II P7913 when the engine caught fire after being accidentally hit. It is alleged that whilst stationed at RAF Sutton Bridge he actually flew under the Crosskeys Bridge that crosses the Nene, which still stands today having been built 1897.

Royal Canadian Air Force
On 1 September 1943, Beurling transferred to the Royal Canadian Air Force, and was posted to an operational squadron, 403 (a return to his first squadron) at Kenley, flying the new Spitfire IX. Shooting down an Fw 190 of JG 2 in September, but unhappy with flying sweeps, Beurling requested command of a flight of North American P-51 Mustangs in order to carry out deep penetration, free-roaming raids into Germany. His request was turned down.

Disciplinary problems annoyed his commander, but Beurling was promoted to flight lieutenant. However, his stunting of a de Havilland Tiger Moth at zero feet over his airfield eventually led to his Wing Commander, Hugh Godefroy, threatening him with a court martial. Subsequently, Beurlin-g was transferred to 126 Wing HQ and then to 412 Squadron.

At 412 Squadron, Beurling again came into conflict with his commander for stunting and his lack of teamwork, leading to his eventual grounding. He claimed his last kill on 30 December, shooting down and wounding Uzz. Heinz Wyrich of 5 Staffel, JG 26 flying a Fw 190A-45 W.Nr. 1175, Weisse 16 2 km S. of Romaine, when the squadron was covering returning American bombers near Compiègne, France.

Discharge
Beurling returned to Canada in April 1944. He was given an honourable discharge in October and, despite an attempt to join the United States Army Air Forces, his wartime flying was over. He ended his career as a squadron leader with 31 and one shared official kills, nine claimed damaged, along with a DSO, DFC and a DFM and Bar.

Death
In 1948, Beurling was recruited to fly P-51 Mustangs for the Israeli Air Force. After a test flight, Beurling fatally crashed his Noorduyn Norseman transport aircraft while landing at Aeroporto dell'Urbe in Rome on 20 May 1948, just six days after the Israeli Declaration of Independence. 

It was his tenth crash. Suspicion at the time of the accident centred on possible sabotage, which was never proven. "The initial report, while it identified the crew as Beurling and Leonard Cohen (another Malta RAF pilot), acknowledged that the bodies were burned beyond recognition."  Beurling's widow, family and personal friends were not in attendance at the funeral in Rome. On a small brass plate over the lid of the coffin were the words "Colonel Georgio Beurling".

Beurling's coffin was kept for three months in a warehouse in the Verano Monumental Cemetery, as nobody had claimed the body. Then his widow, Diana Whittall Gardner, had him buried in the Cimitero Acattolico behind the Cestia Pyramid, between the graves of Percy Bysshe Shelley and John Keats. In November 1950, two and half years after his death, Beurling's casket arrived at Haifa Airport. His coffin, draped with the blue and white Israeli flag, was laid in a nearby air force base, where an honour guard of young airmen mounted a silent watch. During the long funeral in the streets of Haifa, Israeli Air Force aircraft paid homage to Beurling. At last, he was re-interred in the military cemetery at the foot of Mount Carmel. The grave is marked, as are the others in Israel Defense Forces cemeteries, with only name, serial number and rank: for Beurling that of segen (lieutenant).

LegacyMalta Spitfire, an account of his time in Malta, co-written by Leslie Roberts and Beurling, was first published in 1943.

"In Verdun the only reminder of the famous son is the boulevard which carries Beurling's name." Beurling Academy, a high school in the Lester B. Pearson School Board in Verdun, is also named after him.

Summary of victory claims

Beurling was provisionally credited with 31 air victories destroyed (and one third shared destroyed), and 9 damaged. 

References

Notes

Citations

Bibliography

 
 
 
 
 
 

 
 
 McCall, Bruce. "Ode on a Canadian Warbird." Air & Space,Volume 24, Issue 6, December 2009/January 2010, pp. 50–53.
 
 Oswald, Mary. They Led the Way: Members of Canada's Aviation Hall of Fame''. Wetaskiwin, Alberta: Canada's Aviation Hall of Fame, 1999. .

External links

 An excellent biography of George "Screwball" Beurling
 An extensive biography of Beurling
 Beurling Academy
 Canada's Aviation Hall of Fame official site

1921 births
1948 deaths
Royal Air Force officers
Royal Canadian Air Force personnel of World War II
Canadian World War II flying aces
Canadian World War II pilots
Companions of the Distinguished Service Order
Recipients of the Distinguished Flying Cross (United Kingdom)
Recipients of the Distinguished Flying Medal
People from Verdun, Quebec
Royal Air Force pilots of World War II
Canada–Israel relations
Aviators killed in aviation accidents or incidents in Italy
Victims of aviation accidents or incidents in 1948